Tascina orientalis is a moth in the Castniidae family. It is found in Singapore and Peninsular Malaysia.

Adults have orange hindwings with a broad black border. This genus is the only Oriental representative of the Castniidae. The three described species are virtually restricted to Sundaland, as the type species of Neocastnia is only known from the Tenasserim region of Burma, just north of Peninsular Malaysia. There is a fourth species, undescribed, with the upper-side entirely black, the forewing with an oblique white bar typical of the genus, and the narrowly falcate apex as in the type species. It is represented by a single specimen taken in Sumatra at Lebong Candis on a pass at about 400m; the hindwings below are mainly rusty orange.

References

Moths described in 1877
Castniidae